O Carballiño is a comarca in the Galician Province of Ourense. The overall population of this local region is 26,549 (2019).

Municipalities
San Amaro, Beariz, Boborás, O Carballiño, San Cristovo de Cea, O Irixo, Maside, Piñor and Punxín.

References

Comarcas of the Province of Ourense